Kim Hwa-soon (born 12 April 1962) is a South Korean former basketball player who competed in the 1984 Summer Olympics and in the 1988 Summer Olympics. She later attended night school at the Chung-Ang University, graduating in 2002 with a degree in Physical Education.

References

1962 births
Living people
South Korean women's basketball players
Basketball players at the 1984 Summer Olympics
Basketball players at the 1988 Summer Olympics
Medalists at the 1984 Summer Olympics
Olympic basketball players of South Korea
Olympic silver medalists for South Korea
Olympic medalists in basketball
Basketball players at the 1982 Asian Games
Basketball players at the 1986 Asian Games
Asian Games medalists in basketball
Asian Games silver medalists for South Korea
Medalists at the 1982 Asian Games
Medalists at the 1986 Asian Games